Chaungzon is a town on Bilu Island (Belu-kyun) in the Mon State of south-east Myanmar.

References

External links

Township capitals of Myanmar
Populated places in Mon State